Grant Anderson (born 30 October 1999) is an Australian professional rugby league footballer who plays as a er and  for the Melbourne Storm  in the NRL.

Early life
Anderson was born in Fremantle, Western Australia and he grew up in Belmont, New South Wales. He was educated at  Hunter Sports High School, Newcastle.

Grant played junior rugby league for the Central Charlestown Butcher Boys and Valentine-Eleebana Red Devils before signing with Newcastle Knights.

Playing career

Early career
After playing junior representatives for Newcastle Knights, Anderson played for the Northern Pride during the 2021 Queensland Cup season, scoring nine tries in 15 appearances. He transferred to Sunshine Coast Falcons ahead of the 2022 Queensland Cup season, after spending the preseason with Melbourne Storm.

2022
In round 14 of the 2022 NRL season, Anderson made his club debut (cap 222) for the Melbourne Storm against the Sydney Roosters, as he replaced Xavier Coates who injured his ankle during the first game of State of Origin. Anderson would make six appearances for Melbourne, with his two tries on debut the highlight.

References

External Links
QRL profile
Melbourne Storm profile

1999 births
Living people
Australian rugby league players
Melbourne Storm players
Sunshine Coast Falcons players
Northern Pride RLFC players
Rugby league players from Fremantle